Dmitry Valentinovich Lapikov (born June 4, 1982 in Kaliningrad) is a former Russian weightlifter.

Career
At the 2005 World Championships he ranked 4th, with a total of 408 kg. He won gold in the snatch, silver in the clean and jerk, and overall silver at the 2006 World Championships, with a total of 414 kg.

Lapikov originally won the bronze medal in the 105 kg event at the 2008 Beijing Olympics, with a total of 420 kg. In 2016, he was stripped of his medal after his sample tested positive for steroids.

Lapikov tested positive and was disqualified from the +105 kg event of the European Championship 2011. He originally won the +105 kg category with a 192 snatch, 227 clean and jerk, and 419 total.

References

External links
 
 
 
 

1982 births
Living people
Sportspeople from Kaliningrad
Russian male weightlifters
Weightlifters at the 2008 Summer Olympics
Olympic weightlifters of Russia
Competitors stripped of Summer Olympics medals
Doping cases in weightlifting
Russian sportspeople in doping cases
European Weightlifting Championships medalists
World Weightlifting Championships medalists